Gunvor Eldegard (born 14 April 1963 in Årdal) is a Norwegian politician for the Labour Party.

She was elected to the Norwegian Parliament from Akershus in 2005.

On the local level Eldegard was a member of the executive committee of Ski municipal council from 1999 to 2003, and then served as mayor to 2005.

References

1963 births
Living people
Members of the Storting
Labour Party (Norway) politicians
Mayors of places in Akershus
Women mayors of places in Norway
20th-century Norwegian women politicians
20th-century Norwegian politicians
21st-century Norwegian politicians
21st-century Norwegian women politicians
Women members of the Storting
People from Årdal